The Edmonton Folk Music Festival (EFMF) is an annual four-day outdoor music event held the second weekend of August in Edmonton, Alberta, Canada, established in 1980 by Don Whalen. The festival continues to draw many people from around the world as both spectators and performers. The current producer of the festival is Terry Wickham.

During the daytime hours of the festival, there are six active stages hosting workshops and concerts. Food vendors number in the dozens, ranging from carnival fare to vegetarian and world cuisine. A tent village houses craftspeople and there is a CD tent where the performers' albums can be purchased. There is also a large and busy beer garden, which serves more beer than any other single event in western Canada.

The EFMF relies heavily on volunteers which keeps ticket prices down. Volunteers do everything from picking garbage to working as stage hands. There are over 2700 people on the volunteer list each year.

The EFMF is held at Gallagher Park, on the southern slope of the North Saskatchewan River valley. During the winter the area is a ski club. The mainstage audience seating is a natural amphitheatre with great sightlines. The skyline of downtown Edmonton acts as a backdrop for the stage.

For two years, a fifth evening of music was added, with revenue from that concert being dedicated to the festival's endowment fund. Since 2011, the festival has been four days.

The festival is extremely successful, and has sold out for 21 years (as of 2015) (12,000 weekend passes and 1,000 single-day tickets evenly divided between in-person and online sales) in just minutes.

Performers
The Edmonton Folk Music Festival has hosted musicians from six continents, including acts from Cuba, Mexico, Brazil, Zimbabwe, South Africa, Kenya, Mongolia, China, India, and Tuva. The majority of performers come from Canada, the United States, and the United Kingdom.

The festival showcases performers in many genres. Most years, folk, Celtic, bluegrass, blues, gospel, roots, and worldbeat acts perform. Global representation is a major part of the festival, with musicians travelling from North America, Latin America, Europe, Africa, Asia, and Australia every year. Past main stage performers include k.d. lang, Joni Mitchell, Blue Rodeo, Stan Rogers, Great Big Sea, Oysterband, Loreena McKennitt, Norah Jones, Steve Earle, The Blind Boys Of Alabama, David Gray, Neko Case, Van Morrison, David Byrne, Michael Franti, Hanggai, K'Naan, and Passenger. In addition to mainstage and sidestage concerts by individual artists, the festival has artists collaborate on shared stages.

Each year, the festival showcases local Edmonton performers, from youth to young adults to seasoned performers.

History
The first edition of the festival was organized as part of the 75th anniversary celebrations of Alberta, and was held in Gold Bar Park, moving to its current venue in 1981. 2020 was the first year in the history of the festival where the event was cancelled, due to COVID-19.

Artistic directors
1980-1985 Don Whalen
1986-1988 Holger Petersen
1989–present Terry Wickham

See also

List of festivals in Edmonton
List of festivals in Alberta
List of music festivals in Canada

References

Further reading

External links
Edmonton Folk Music Festival Official website
Edmonton Folk Music Festival Programs (archive)

Folk festivals in Canada
Music festivals in Edmonton
1980 establishments in Alberta
Music festivals established in 1980